Tagala Talaga is the third studio album by Filipino singer-actress Regine Velasquez, released in October 1991 by Vicor Records in the Philippines in LP, cassette and CD format. It is her second album from Vicor Music Corporation after Nineteen 90 (1990). The album was produced by her then manager Ronnie Henares and consisted of Velasquez’ renditions of classic Filipino compositions by Freddie Aguilar, Ryan Cayabyab, Willy Cruz and George Canseco among others. The carrier single released is "Buhay Ng Buhay Ko" originally done by the Leah Navarro and composed by Nonong Pedero. The album was certified gold and double platinum by the Philippine Association of the Record Industry (PARI).

Background
Tagala Talaga ("A Genuine Tagalog Lady") is her last album from Vicor Music Corporation before moving to Polycosmic Records. The album was her first all covers album re-interpreting classic OPM songs including compositions from National Artists for Music Awardees Ryan Cayabyab, Lucio D. San Pedro, and Levi Celerio. Velasquez had a concert with the same album title under the direction of Freddie Santos with the Philippine Philharmonic Orchestra after the album release.

Track listing

Album Credits
Personnel
Chito Ilagan – executive producer
Ronnie Henares – producer
Bambi Santos – assistant producer
Ida Ramos-Henares – cover and design
Jojo Isorena – cover and design
Romy Peralta – photography
Production
The Philippine Philharmonic Orchestra – orchestration, strings (tracks 3 and 7)
 Restituto Umali – conductor, arranger (tracks 3 and 7)
Louie Ocampo – arranger (tracks 1 and 6)
Eric Antonio – arranger (track 2)
Henry Garcia – arranger (tracks 4 and 8)
Carlo Bulahan – arranger (track 5)

References

See also
 Regine Velasquez discography
 List of best-selling albums in the Philippines

Regine Velasquez albums
1991 albums
Covers albums